"The Devil's Walk: A Ballad" was a major poetical work published as a broadside by Percy Bysshe Shelley in 1812. The poem consisted of seven irregular ballad stanzas of 49 lines. The poem was a satirical attack and criticism of the British government. Satan is depicted meeting with key members of the British government. The poem was modelled on and meant as a continuation of "The Devil's Thoughts" of 1799 by Samuel Taylor Coleridge and Robert Southey. The work is important in Shelley's development and evolution of writings that castigate and criticise the British government to achieve political and economic reform.

Background
The poem was written in 1812 by Shelley to protest the actions of the British government and harsh economic conditions in the country at the time. The poem emerged after the food riots in Devon where Shelley lived at that time. Prices for grain were at their highest level in 1812, there were shortages of food, and prices were inflated. Shelley attacked "a brainless King" and the "princely paunch" and "each brawny haunch" of the Prince Regent. The members of both houses of Parliament and the Church were also castigated. Political leaders and the wealthy were also attacked. The British war in Spain was similarly criticised.

Plot

The devil, Beelzebub, awoke and dressed in his Sunday clothes. He puts on boots to hide his hooves and gloves to hide his claws. He wears a three-cornered hat, a bras chapeau, to hide his horns. 

He went to London where he discussed religion and scandals with a friend. He went to St. James’s Court and St. Paul’s Church. He was “an agriculturist” and took care of his farm and his live-stock.

The devil then sat next to a priest at prayestates that without the Devil, the priest would have no job.

He then observed “a brainless King” with his attendants.

He observes that political leaders thrive from war and conflict and human misery. He castigates British policy in Ireland and the British military engagement in Spain against France. He attacks Lord Castlereagh. He attacks the Prince as being fat and having a “maudlin brain”. He observes that the Devil, sometimes called Nature, supports “men of power” and privilege.

He next observed a lawyer kill a “viper” which climbed up the leg of the table. The Devil hums “a hellish song”, comparing himself to a “yeoman” who surveys his lands contemplating his profits and gains.

He noted how the wealthy plunder and impoverish the poor. He castigates Bishops and Lawyers for their greed and pomp.

He next encounters a statesman to whom he reveals himself. The hell-hounds Murder, Want, and Woe, flocked around them. He castigates the carnage in Spain.

The devil is joyful. Monarchs prosper in war and turmoil and depredation. 

Reason, however, will ultimately prevail. Those with reason, “the sons of Reason”, understand that as reason prevails, the rule of tyrants will be short-lived and they will eventually be overthrown

References

Sources 
 Forman, Harry Buxton. The Poetical Works of Percy Bysshe Shelley. London: Reeves and Turner, 1877.
 Chewning, Harris. "William Michael Rossetti and the Shelley Renaissance." Keats-Shelley Journal, Vol. 4, (Winter 1955).
 McCarthy, Denis Florence. Shelly's Early Life From Original Sources. London: Hotten, 1872. 
 Jones, Frederick L., ed. The Letters Of Percy Bysshe Shelley. Oxford: Clarendon Press, 1964.
 Duff, David. Romance And Revolution: Shelley And The Politics Of A Genre. Cambridge: Cambridge University Press, 1994.
 Cameron, Kenneth. The Young Shelley: Genesis Of A Radical. New York: Macmillan, 1950.
 Keach, William. "Early Shelley: Vulgarisms, Politics, and Fractals: Young Shelley." Romantic Circles.
 Stuart Curran, University of Pennsylvania, "On Devils, and the Devil; or Vice's Versus". Romantic Circles. Electronic resource, University of Maryland.
 Adriana Craciun, Loyola University Chicago, "Heavenly Medicine in Hellish Songs: Diabolical Hypertext". Romantic Circles Electronic Resource.
 Neil Fraistat, "The 'Devil' to Edit: Time, Space and Hypertextuality", University of Maryland. Romantic Circles.
 Robert Griffin, Tel Aviv University, "The Mode of Existence of Shelley's 'The Devil's Walk'". Romantic Circles.
 Terence Hoagwood, Texas A&M University, "Meaning and the Mode of Existence of 'Works': A Response to Robert J. Griffin, "The Mode of Existence of Shelley's 'The Devil's Walk'". Romantic Circles.
 Michael O'Neill, University of Durham, UK, "'A Hellish Song': Shelley's 'The Devil's Walk'". Romantic Circles.
 Andrew Stauffer, University of Virginia, Response. Romantic Circles.
 Morton Paley, University of California, Berkeley, "'The Devil's Walk' and 'The Devil's Thoughts'". Romantic Circles. 
 Bruce Graver, Providence College, Response. Romantic Circles.
 Don Reiman, University of Delaware, "Shelley and Popular Culture: 'The Devil's Walk'" 
 Michael Scrivener, Wayne State University, Response. Romantic Circles.
 Chris Foss, Texas Christian University, "Satiric Verses: On Shelley's 'The Devil's Walk' and 'The Mask of Anarchy'". Romantic Circles.
 Jones, Steven E. Shelley's Satire: Violence, Exhortation, and Authority. DeKalb: Northern Illinois University Press, 1994.

External links
 Online version of "The Devil's Walk" at Wikisource
 

1812 poems
Poetry by Percy Bysshe Shelley
Fiction about the Devil
1810s works
Works by Percy Bysshe Shelley